The Acanthoclininae is a subfamily of ray-finned fishes, one of two in the family Plesiopidae. They are characterised by the head being  scaleless or nearly scaleless, a dorsal fin which has 17–26 spines and 2–6 soft rays, an anal fin having 7–16 spines and 2–6 soft rays while the pelvic fin has one spine and two soft rays. There are between one and four lateral lines, the number of vertebrae is between 26 and 35.

Genera
The genera currently recognised as belonging to the subfamily Acanthoclininae are:

 Genus Acanthoclinus Jenyns, 1841    
 Genus Acanthoplesiops Regan, 1912    
 Genus Beliops Hardy, 1985    
 Genus Belonepterygion McCulloch, 1915
 Genus Notograptus Günther, 1867

References

 
Plesiopidae
Taxa named by Albert Günther
Ray-finned fish subfamilies